Großhaslach is a village and a former municipality in the municipality of Petersaurach, in the district of Ansbach, Middle Franconia, Germany.

References

Ansbach (district)
Former municipalities in Bavaria